Qalamoun offensive may refer to:
 Qalamoun offensive (2014)
 Qalamoun offensive (May–June 2015)
 Qalamoun offensive (2017)